In 4-dimensional geometry, the dodecahedral bipyramid is the direct sum of a dodecahedron and a segment, {5,3} + { }. Each face of a central dodecahedron is attached with two pentagonal pyramids, creating 24 pentagonal pyramidal cells, 72 isosceles triangular faces, 70 edges, and 22 vertices. A dodecahedral bipyramid can be seen as two dodecahedral pyramids augmented together at their base.

It is the dual of a icosahedral prism.

See also
 Tetrahedral bipyramid
 Cubic bipyramid
 Icosahedral bipyramid

References

External links
 Dodecahedral tegum

4-polytopes